The Szczecin-Dąbie Airstrip (ICAO code: EPSD; Polish: Lotnisko Szczecin-Dąbie; German: Flugplatz Stettin-Dąbie), historically also known as Stettin Airfield (German: Flugplatz Stettin), and Dąbie Lake Airfield (German: Flughafen am Dammschen See), is a small airstrip on the Eastern bank of the Oder river in Dąbie, Szczecin, Poland. The original grass landing strip was built in 1921 and was used for domestic flights of Deutsche Luft Hansa over the following years. After World War II, LOT began serving the airfield, which remained the only one in Szczecin until 23 May 1967, when Solidarity Szczecin–Goleniów Airport was opened.

Airports in Poland
Dabie Airstrip
Buildings and structures in Szczecin